Denise Zimmermann (born 5 August 1988) is a German former competitive figure skater. She placed 17th at the 2004 World Junior Championships.

Zimmermann represented the Mannheimer ERC and was coached by Peter Sczypa. In the summer of 2014, she married German figure skater Peter Liebers. On May 1, 2015, Zimmermann gave birth to the couple's first child, a son named Emil.

Programs

Competitive highlights
JGP: ISU Junior Grand Prix

References

External links
 
 Denise Zimmermann at Tracings.net

1988 births
Living people
German female single skaters
Sportspeople from Mannheim